André José Cozma (born 30 November 2002) is a Romanian professional footballer who plays as a midfielder for CSM Bacău.

References

External links
 
 

2002 births
Living people
Romanian footballers
Association football midfielders
Liga I players
Liga II players
Liga III players
FC Argeș Pitești players
CS Mioveni players